Pranciškus Tupikas (January 2, 1929 – July 16, 2015) was a Lithuanian politician.  In 1990 he was among those who signed the Act of the Re-Establishment of the State of Lithuania.

References

 Biography

1929 births
2015 deaths
Members of the Seimas